Norman Keith Flowers (born March 15, 1974) is an American serial killer who killed three women by beating and strangling them in their Las Vegas apartments from March to May 2005. DNA left at each crime scene eventually linked him to the killings and he was arrested. Flowers was tried in 2008 and convicted, receiving a life sentence without parole. He entered an alford plea for the remaining charges in 2011 and received a two more life sentences.

Early life 

Flowers was born on March 15, 1974, and raised in a dysfunctional family in Compton, California, an area known for poverty and violence. He experienced physical and sexual abuse and was once abandoned. In 1993, Flowers was convicted of burglary, robbery, and an arson-fire that killed a dog. In 1999 he was convicted of the unlawful use of a deadly weapon and burglary, crimes for which he was later released for in 2003.

Murders 

Over the span of 41 days in early 2005, Flowers burglarized three Las Vegas apartments and attacked the occupants, all of whom were women. He would then excessively beat and rape them, then afterwards strangle them to death. He had connections to all of his victims through his two girlfriends.

In 2004, Flowers met Debra Quarles, who he formed a relationship with. From there he met Quarles daughter, Sheila, 18. He fathered a boy around this same time. They did however break up at some point. On March 24, 2005, Sheila stayed home from her job at a Starbucks, while Debra left for her job. Sometime during that day, Flowers let himself into the apartment and attacked Sheila in the apartment bathroom. He beat, raped, and strangled her to death. He left her body face up in the bathtub which was full of hot water. He then took her cell phone, bankcard, and jewelry. Flowers left the apartment, and Debra found the body later that day. Police collected male DNA found in Sheila's vaginal area. In the weeks following, Flowers comforted Debra in the wake of her daughter's murder and recommended her to take counseling. Flowers started dating another woman, Mawusi Ragland, whom he had known since the early 1990s.

On May 4, Flowers killed his last two victims within eight hours of one another; he burglarized the apartment belonging to Marilee Coote, 45, whom he bludgeoned, assaulted, and strangled her to death. Hours later, he knocked on the door of Juanita Curry, but she failed to answer. A few more hours later Flowers burglarized another apartment, that of Rena Gonzalez, 25, whom he raped and strangled with a telephone cord. Later that night, Flowers attempted to kiss a woman in the same apartment complex, but she rejected his sexual advances.

Arrest 

Flowers was interviewed about the murders a few days later and denied committing them. With the help of DNA, Flowers was arrested on June 6, 2005, and charged with the murder of Marilee Coote. After his arrest, the string of murders suddenly stopped, and Flowers became the prime suspect, and, with DNA testing, he was linked to them and formally charged. DNA belonging to a second man was found on Sheila's body, later being matched to a man named George Brass; however, Brass came forward and stated that he was a friend of Sheila and that he had consented sex with her. A local Walmart, where Brass worked, confirmed that he was working at the time of Sheila's murder, thus, he was cleared of suspicion. Flowers' attorneys argued in late June that, with damage to Coote's internal organs, she could have died accidentally during sex.

Legal proceedings 

Flowers went to trial for the murder of Sheila Quarles in 2008, with prosecutors seeking the death penalty against him. In October 2008, the jury found him guilty of Sheila's murder. In the sentencing phase of the trial Flowers' mother Eleanor pleaded for the jury to not sentence him to death and argued that the son she knew was a caring, loyal young man. The jury dismissed the death sentence afterwards, and instead sentenced Flowers to life imprisonment without parole. 

He was scheduled to head to trial for the murders of Coote and Gonzalez. In June 2011 Flowers entered an Alford plea, which allowed him to admit prosecutors had enough evidence to convict him without him having to confess. In August 2011, he was imposed two more life sentences. He is currently serving his sentence at High Desert State Prison in Clark County, Nevada.

2004 cold case investigation 

In February 2023, Las Vegas police said they had found DNA evidence linking Flowers to another murder: the October 2004 killing of Keysha Brown, 28. Investigators believe Brown was Flowers' first victim. Brown was found dead in her bathtub on October 19, 2004, and detectives determined she had been stabbed, beaten, and strangled. The autopsy also concluded that she had been sexually assaulted.

See also 
 List of serial killers in the United States

References 

1978 births
21st-century American criminals
American male criminals
American people convicted of murder
American people convicted of robbery
American rapists
American serial killers
Criminals from California
Living people
Male serial killers
People convicted of murder by Nevada
Prisoners sentenced to life imprisonment by Nevada
People from Compton, California
People from Las Vegas